"Humdrum and Harum-Scarum: A Lecture on Free Verse" is an essay by the poet Robert Bridges, first published in November 1922 in both the North American Review and the London Mercury.  In it Bridges explains what he regards as the 'adverse conditions' that free verse imposes upon a poet:
 loss of carrying power
 self-consciousness
 same-ness of line structure
 indetermination of subsidiary 'accent'

See also
 1922 in poetry

Essays about poetry
Poetic forms
1922 essays
Works originally published in the London Mercury
Works originally published in the North American Review